Chandragad Fort  / Dhavalgad Fort is a fort located 182 km from Mumbai, in raigad district, of Maharashtra. This fort was an important fort in raigad district as a watch over for the Varandha Ghattrade routes from Bhor to kokan. The fort is surrounded by forest and hill slopes.

History
The fort is close to the Krishna river valley. The fort was captured By Chh.Shivaji Maharaj from Chandrarao More on 15 January 1656 along with Kangori and Rayari. After the death of Chh. Sambhaji maharaj this fort was captured by Itkadar Khan Aka Zulfikar khan who was a commander of Aurangzeb.

How to reach
The trek route starts from Village Dhavale which is located in District Raigad ,Taluka Poladpur. Poladpur to Dhavale distance is 20– 25 km. The path passes through the small Shelarwadi hamlet.

Places to see
There are about 14 rock-cut water tanks and few dilapidated building structures on the fort and one shivleeng is their.

See also 
 List of forts in Maharashtra
 List of forts in India
 Marathi People
 List of Maratha dynasties and states
 Maratha War of Independence
 Battles involving the Maratha Empire
 Maratha Army
 Maratha titles
 Military history of India
 List of people involved in the Maratha Empire

References 

Buildings and structures of the Maratha Empire
16th-century forts in India
Buildings and structures in Maharashtra